XEJB refers to two radio stations, both in Guadalajara, Jalisco and owned by the government of the state of Jalisco:

XEJB-AM 630
XEJB-FM 96.3